HD 73526 is a star in the southern constellation of Vela. With an apparent visual magnitude of +8.99, it is much too faint to be viewed with the naked eye. The star is located at a distance of approximately 318 light years from the Sun based on parallax, and is drifting further away with a radial velocity of +26 km/s. It is a member of the thin disk population.

The stellar classification of HD 73526 is G6 V, indicating this is a G-type main-sequence star that, like the Sun, it is generating energy through core hydrogen fusion. Based on its properties, it may be starting to evolve off the main sequence. This star has slightly more mass than the Sun and a 53% greater radius. The abundance of iron in its atmosphere suggests the star's metallicity – what astronomers term the abundance of elements with higher atomic number than helium – is 70% greater than in the Sun. It is a much older star with an estimated age of nearly ten billion years, and is spinning slowly with a projected rotational velocity of 1.7 km/s. The star is radiating more than double the luminosity of the Sun from its photosphere at an effective temperature of 5,564 K.

Planetary system
On June 13 2002, a 2.1 MJ planet HD 73526 b was announced orbiting HD 73526 in an orbit just a little smaller than that of Venus' orbit around the Sun.  This planet receives insolation 3.65 times that of Earth or 1.89 times that of Venus. This was a single planet system until 2006 when a 2.3 MJ second planet HD 73526 c was discovered. This planet forms a 2:1 orbital resonance with planet b. Although these are minimum masses as the inclinations of these planets are unknown, orbital stability analysis indicated that orbital inclinations of both planets are likely to be near 90°, making the minimum masses very close to the true masses of the planets.

See also
 List of extrasolar planets
 Gliese 876

References

External links
 
 Extrasolar Planet Interactions by Rory Barnes & Richard Greenberg, Lunar and Planetary Lab, University of Arizona


G-type main-sequence stars
Planetary systems with two confirmed planets

Vela (constellation)
Durchmusterung objects
073526
042282